The Eagle is a name used by multiple gay bars. It is not a franchise or chain of gay bars, but rather a name adopted by bars inspired by The Eagle's Nest, a leather bar in New York City. Bars that use the name "Eagle" typically cater to a clientele of gay men in leather and other kink subcultures. As of 2017, over 30 gay bars in locations around the world operate under the name "Eagle".

History
The first gay bar to operate under the name "The Eagle" was The Eagle's Nest (now named Eagle NYC), located in New York City. The bar originally operated as a longshoreman's tavern that opened in 1931 under the name Eagle Open Kitchen. Prompted by the Stonewall riots in 1969 and subsequent growth of the city's gay culture, the tavern's owners converted the establishment into a gay bar in 1970. The Eagle's Nest became a popular gathering point for the city's gay leather subculture, biker groups, and sports clubs, and subsequently inspired the creation of similarly named gay bars across the United States and internationally.

Gay bars that use the name "Eagle" operate as independent businesses, and are not managed by a single corporate entity in the manner of a franchise or chain store. Rather, Eagle bars typically share the common trait of catering to a clientele of masculine-presenting gay men, with specific emphasis on the kink and leather subcultures. The diffuse nature of the ownership of the name "Eagle" resulted in a conflict in 2007 between two gay bar owners in Portland, Oregon who both sought to use the name for their respective bars.

Not all Eagle bars conform to these characteristics; for example, Eagle London began as a leather bar before shifting towards a general LGBT clientele, while Eagle Tokyo bills itself as a "Brooklyn-style" bar targeted towards bears. Some Eagle locations historically enforced strict dress codes obligating patrons to wear leather garments, though NBC News reported in 2017 that these standards have largely been relaxed due to "both societal changes and business realities".

At their peak of popularity, over 50 bars around the world operated under the name "Eagle". As of 2017, there are over 30 Eagle bars, in countries including the United States, Canada, the United Kingdom, the Netherlands, Austria, and Japan.

Notable Eagle bars
Atlanta Eagle
Black Eagle, Montreal
Denver Eagle
The Eagle, Amsterdam
Eagle Houston
Eagle NYC
San Francisco Eagle
Seattle Eagle

References

Leather bars and clubs